Viva la Muerte is the debut album of Cobra Verde. It was released in 1994 through Scat Records.

Track listing

Personnel 
Cobra Verde
Don Depew – bass guitar, guitar, piano, engineering
Doug Gillard – guitar, bass guitar, electric piano, vocals
John Petkovic – vocals, guitar
Dave Swanson – drums, percussion, guitar, vocals
Production and additional personnel
Cobra Verde – production

References 

1994 debut albums
Cobra Verde (band) albums
Scat Records albums